Sitgreaves House, also known as the Crowe House, is a historic home located at Laurens, Laurens County, South Carolina. It was built about 1907, and is a -story, story, frame residence sheathed in weatherboarding with elements of the Queen Anne and Colonial Revival styles. It features a tent-roof tower, hipped roof, and porch with Doric order columns.

It was added to the National Register of Historic Places in 1986.

References 

Houses on the National Register of Historic Places in South Carolina
Queen Anne architecture in South Carolina
Colonial Revival architecture in South Carolina
Houses completed in 1907
Houses in Laurens County, South Carolina
National Register of Historic Places in Laurens County, South Carolina